Clancy is an unincorporated community and census-designated place (CDP) in Jefferson County, Montana, United States. The population was 1,661 at the 2010 census, up from 1,406 in 2000. It is part of the Helena Micropolitan Statistical Area.

The town was founded in 1873 as a gold camp and named for prospector William Clancey. A fire in 1902 destroyed many of the buildings in town.

Geography
Clancy is located in northern Jefferson County at  (46.474638, -111.983497), in the valley of Prickly Pear Creek where it is joined by Clancy Creek. Clancy is bordered to the north by Montana City and to the south by Jefferson City. Interstate 15 passes through Clancy, with access from Exit 182. I-15 leads north  to Helena, the state capital, and south  to Boulder, the Jefferson county seat.

Climate
According to the Köppen Climate Classification system, Clancy has a semi-arid climate, abbreviated "BSk" on climate maps.

Economy
Most people who live in and around Clancy work in Montana's capital city of Helena, which is a short drive north on I-15. Two restaurants operate in Clancy, the Legal Tender and Chubby's Bar and Grill. Elkhorn Health and Rehabilitation runs a small nursing home in the community, and Clancy Elementary School, a K-8 institution, employs more than thirty people.

Demographics

As of the census of 2010, there were 1,661 people, an 18% increase from the 2000 census. In 2000 there were 1,406 people, in 540 households, and 428 families residing in the CDP. The population density was 39.3 people per square mile (15.2/km2). There were 559 housing units at an average density of 15.6 per square mile (6.0/km2). The racial makeup of the CDP was 96.23% White, 0.14% African American, 0.92% Native American, 0.57% Asian, 0.43% from other races, and 1.71% from two or more races. Hispanic or Latino of any race were 1.99% of the population.

There were 540 households, out of which 36.7% had children under the age of 18 living with them, 70.4% were married couples living together, 6.1% had a female householder with no husband present, and 20.6% were non-families. 15.7% of all households were made up of individuals, and 5.4% had someone living alone who was 65 years of age or older. The average household size was 2.60 and the average family size was 2.93.

In the CDP, the population was spread out, with 26.3% under the age of 18, 5.2% from 18 to 24, 26.3% from 25 to 44, 34.4% from 45 to 64, and 7.8% who were 65 years of age or older. The median age was 42 years. For every 100 females, there were 103.2 males. For every 100 females age 18 and over, there were 103.5 males.

The median income for a household in the CDP was $52,938, and the median income for a family was $59,766. Males had a median income of $38,750 versus $24,091 for females. The per capita income for the CDP was $23,492. About 2.0% of families and 3.3% of the population were below the poverty line, including 3.1% of those under age 18 and 3.9% of those age 65 or over.

Education
Jefferson High School in Boulder serves the Clancy students.

The North Jefferson County Library has a location in Clancy.

References

Census-designated places in Jefferson County, Montana
Census-designated places in Montana
Helena, Montana micropolitan area